Sir Rudolph Ion Joseph Agnew (born 12 March 1934) was group chief executive of Consolidated Gold Fields from 1978 to 1989 and chairman from 1983 to 1989.

Early life
Rudolph Agnew was born on 12 March 1934, the son of Rudolph John Agnew and Pamela Geraldine (née Campbell). His grandfather was the mining engineer John Alexander Agnew (1872–1939). He was educated at Downside School.

Career
He was group chief executive of Consolidated Gold Fields from 1978 to 1989 and chairman from 1983 to 1989.

He was knighted in the 2002 New Year Honours.

References 

British chief executives
1934 births
Living people
People educated at Downside School
King's Royal Hussars officers
Knights Bachelor